The Legion of Merit is a decoration of the United States and is awarded to foreign military personnel in four grades and to U.S. military personnel without distinction of degree. The following are notable recipients within the award.

Chief Commander

Commander

Officer

 At the beginning of the North African campaign, Brigadier General Lyman L. Lemnitzer accompanied Major General Mark Wayne Clark by submarine to North Africa. Upon arrival, about 60 officers were awarded the Legion of Merit and were among the first awarded the medal. By some misunderstanding as to the rules governing the awards, these 60 American officers were awarded the degree of Officer. According to Lemnitzer, President Roosevelt was quite annoyed but did not rescind the awards. These were the only U.S. officers (or service personnel of any rank) awarded the Legion of Merit with a degree.
 In March 1945, Colonel Hsieh Mang, of the Chinese Army was awarded the Legion of Merit for his work with the First American Volunteer Group "Flying Tigers".
 In 1945, Lieutenant Colonel William E. Fairbairn, a former British General Service Corps who transferred to United States as "officer in rent" to train SOE agents and later the Office of Strategic Services (OSS), for his achievements in training OSS personnel. Fairbairn eventually rose to the rank of lieutenant-colonel by the end of the war, and received the U.S. Legion of Merit (officer grade) at the specific request of "Wild Bill" Donovan, founder of the OSS. Known as the teacher of close combat fighting in Camp X and teaching defendu, a special forces close combat system. Following his instruction at Camp X, Fairbairn was rejoined by his pupil Col. Applegate to form the United States "School for Spies and Assassins", then called "Camp B", now known as Camp David. Not well known by the public because his techniques were often brutal, and were considered too dangerous to be widely publicly known. Some people considered him as a British agent in disguise and a prototype of Ian Fleming's character of James Bond. Fairbairn was also the teacher of Lt. Colonel Robert T. Frederick, the designer of Army Special Unit knife V-42 stiletto which was based on Fairbairn–Sykes commando knife. Fairbairn also a friend of Captain Dermot Michael "Pat" O'Neill, the First Special Service Force's close-combat instructor.
 In 1945, Colonel Movlid Visaitov, commander of the 255th Separate Chechen-Ingush Cavalry Regiment and the 28th Guards Regiment. Visaitov was the first Soviet officer to shake hands with General Bolling at the Elbe River.
 On 27 September 1945, General Alois Liška of the Czechoslovak Army under former U.S. command, was awarded by General Ernest N. Harmon in Prague
 Group Captain Harry Day, Senior Officer at numerous POW camps during World War II, and significantly helped American POWs endure the captivity, as well as organizing escape operations. He received the award on July 5, 1946.
 In 1946, Commodore Alfred Victor Knight of the Royal Australian Navy was awarded the commendation for honorary services. The citation described him as a 'forceful leader' who, by his 'splendid co-operation in the conduct of a vital training programme, aggressive determination and untiring energies ... contributed materially to combined large-scale operations'.
 On 3 September 1946, Vice Admiral Henry George Harry DeWolf  of the Royal Canadian Navy was awarded the legion of Merit officer level for honorary services. The citation description "For exceptionally meritorious conduct in the performance of outstanding service while serving as Chief Staff Officer to Rear-Admiral G.C. Jones, RCN. He frequently conferred with Commander Task Force Twenty-four and his staff in connection with planning and the operational control of the surface forces under Commander Task Force Twenty-four. His excellent professional grasp of strategic and tactical situations, together with his intelligent and co-operative attitude, contributed materially to the success of operations conducted by Commander Task force Twenty-four."
 In 1947, Colonel Valentine Patrick Terrel Vivian head of counter-espionage, Section V, and Vice-Chief of the S.I.S. or MI6. The citation reads, as deputy director of a special British agency in the European Theater of Operations from January 1943 to June 1945, rendered exceptionally devoted and meritorious service to the Allied armies, by American forces in a special province of military operations, and continuing it through the long period of preparation for the Normandy invasion and during the march into Germany, Colonel Vivian made an outstanding contribution to Allied military and to the enemy's defeat.
 In 1948, then Brigadier General John Frederick Boyce Combe was made an Officer of the Legion for his contribution "to the over-all success Allied forces in Italy" during World War II.
 In 1948, Air Chief Marshal Donald Perera VSV, USP, Sri Lanka Air Force.
 In 1950 Air Commodore Leonard Birchall (Royal Canadian Air Force) was made an officer of the Legion for his life imperiling heroic actions as a Japanese POW in WWII: "His exploits became legendary throughout Japan and brought renewed faith and strength to many hundreds of ill and disheartened prisoners." – U.S. President Harry S. Truman.
 In 1953, The President of the United States of America, authorized by Act of Congress, 20 July 1942, takes pleasure in presenting the Legion of Merit, in the Degree of Officer to Major General [then Brigadier General] Ham Byong Sun, Republic of Korea Army, for exceptionally meritorious conduct in the performance of outstanding services to the Government of the United States from 28 April 1951 to 3 April 1952.
 In 1953, Major General [then Brigadier General] Kim Chum Kon, Republic of Korea Army, was made an Officer of the Legion for service 25 October 1952 – 14 February 1953.
 For service 10 September 1952 – 27 April 1954, Brigadier General Shim On Bong of the Republic of Korea Army
 For service August 1953 – March 1955, Major General Chang Kuk Chang of the Republic of Korea Army
 In 1957, Colonel Stig Wennerström was made an Officer of the Legion for serving as an air attaché in Washington, D.C. from 1952 to 1957.
 In 1959, Major General Mian Ghulam Jilani was made an Officer of the Legion for exceptionally meritorious conduct in the performance of outstanding services to the Government of the United States, from October 1952 to June 1955.
 In 1960 Major General Mian Hayaud Din was made an Officer of the Legion for his role as Chief of the Pakistan Military Mission to the United States from 1955 to 1960.
In 1973 "by Direction of the President, Major General Liu Wan-Tsai, Chinese Air Force, [was] awarded the Legion of Merit (Degree of Officer) for exceptionally meritorious service as Air Attache, Embassy of the Republic of China, Washington, D.C., from 4 April 1969 to 27 July 1972."
 In 1996, Lieutenant General Roméo Dallaire of the Canadian Army was made an Officer of the Legion for his role as Commander of the United Nations peacekeeping force in Rwanda during the civil war and subsequent genocide.
 On 18 December 1980 Major General Shlomo Inbar, Israel Army, was made an Officer of the Legion of Merit for his exceptionally meritorious conduct in the outstanding performance of duties as Defense and Armed Forces Attache, Embassy of Israel to the United States of America, from July 1977 to August 1980.
 In 2000, Lieutenant General Danfer  G. Suarez was made an Officer of the Legion "Exceptionally meritorious conduct in the performance of outstanding services as the Peruvian Air Attache from 1997 to 1998.
 In 2006, Lieutenant General Nick Houghton, British Army, "in recognition of gallant and distinguished services during coalition operations in Iraq."
 In 2007, Lieutenant General Sir Robert Fry, Royal Marines, "in recognition of gallant and distinguished service during coalition operations in Iraq.
 Lieutenant General Tariq Khan became the fourth Pakistani officer to receive the award for meritorious services as a liaison officer at CENTCOM during Operations Enduring Freedom (December 9, 2007).
 In 2008, Air Chief Marshal Sir Glenn Torpy Head of the Royal Air Force, for his part in Operation Telic / Operation Iraqi Freedom.
 Lieutenant General Sir James Dutton, Royal Marines, "in recognition of meritorious, gallant and distinguished services during coalition operations in Afghanistan".
 Major General Colin Boag, British Army, "in recognition of gallant and distinguished services during coalition operations in Iraq" (March 2008).
 Lieutenant General James Bucknall, British Army, "in recognition of gallant and distinguished services during coalition operations in Iraq" (July 2009).
 Major General Mohamed Elkeshky, Egyptian Army Defense, Military, Naval and Air Attaché to the United States. (2013).
 In 2011, Vice Admiral Tomohisa Takei, Japan Maritime Self-Defense Force, "as recognition for Takei's exceptional leadership and expertise in maturing and expanding the JMSDF and U.S. Navy partnership during his role as director of operations and plans department, JMSDF Maritime Staff Office from April 2008 to July 2010".
 In 2013, Lieutenant General Walter Souza Braga Netto, Brazilian Army, Military Attaché to the United States of America. "For exceptionally meritous conduct in the performance of outstanding services from March 2011 to May 2013.
 In 2014, Air Commodore David Best, United Kingdom Royal Air Force. "For exceptionally meritorious service as Director of Air Operations, International Security Assistance Force, from December 2010 to December 2011".
 In 2014, Major General Brett Cairns, Canadian Air Force, NORAD J3. "For exceptionally meritorious service as Director of Operations, Headquarters North American Aerospace Defense Command, Peterson Air Force Base, Colorado, from May 2005 to August 2008."
 In 2016, Brigadier General Paul Rutherford, Canadian Army, United States Central Command. "For exceptionally meritorious service as Deputy Director, Strategy, Plans and Policy Military to Military, Strategy, Plans and Policy Directorate, United States Central Command, MacDill Air Force Base, Florida, from August 2013 to August 2015."
 In 2018, Air Commodore A. P. T. Smith (UK).
 In 2018, Air Commodore Stephen Lushington (UK).  For exceptionally meritorious service, NATO Forces, Afghanistan.
In 2019, Brigadier General Suzanne Melotte, For exceptionally meritorious service NATO Forces, Afghanistan.

Legionnaire

When the Legion of Merit is awarded to members of the Armed Forces of the United States, it is awarded without reference to degree. The medal and ribbon of this fourth degree (Legionnaire) are used for such purpose though.

The US Army and US Air Force do not authorize the "V" Device for the Legion of Merit. The U.S. Navy, the U.S. Marine Corps, and the United States Coast Guard do.

The first U.S. Armed Forces recipient of the Legion of Merit medal was WWII combat veteran Lt. (j.g.) Ann Bernatitus, U.S.N., one of the "Angels of Bataan" and the only U.S. Navy nurse to escape from Bataan and Corregidor during the war. She was also the first person authorized to wear the "V" Device with the award. Her medal is now housed at the Smithsonian Institution.

References